Otok  is a settlement in the administrative district of Gmina Kiełczygłów, within Pajęczno County, Łódź Voivodeship, in central Poland.

References

Villages in Pajęczno County